The Memorial Bridge, also known as the Kennebec Memorial Bridge, is a bridge in Augusta, Maine, that crosses the Kennebec River, joining the east and west sides of the city. It carries U.S. Route 201, U.S. Route 202, Route 11, and Route 100. The bridge is approximately 2,100 feet (640 m) long and has two lanes for traffic and a barrier-protected sidewalk for pedestrians on each side of the roadway. It was built in 1949.

Safety fence
The Memorial Bridge is located near a state psychiatric hospital, the Riverview Psychiatric Center. In 1983, after a number of deaths by suicide occurred on the bridge, an 11-foot‐high safety fence was installed on each side of the bridge. The fence was effective in deterring suicide by jumping.

In 2006, the fence was temporarily removed due to a renovation project, and this sparked debate on whether the fence was necessary.

See also

References

Road bridges in Maine
Bridges in Kennebec County, Maine
Bridges completed in 1949
Former toll bridges in Maine
Bridges of the United States Numbered Highway System
U.S. Route 202